Margh (also Romanized as Morgh; also known as Marq) is a village in Kenarrudkhaneh Rural District, in the Central District of Golpayegan County, Isfahan Province, Iran. At the 2006 census, its population was 51, in 17 families.

References 

Populated places in Golpayegan County